Sattu is a type of flour, mainly used in India and Tibet. It consists of a mixture of roasted ground pulses and cereals. The dry powder is prepared in various ways as a principal or secondary ingredient of dishes. Sattu is used in vegetarian cuisine as it can be a source of protein.

Etymology 
The Hindi word Sattu is derived from Sanskrit word Saktu meaning coarsely ground parched barley meal. References to Sattu (Saktu) can be found throughout Ayurvedic literature such as the Caraka-saṃhitā, Aṣṭāṅgahṛdayasaṃhitā and the Suśruta-saṃhitā.

History
The Origin of Sattu is Magadh Region of Bihar.
The process of preparing sattu is ancient and is popular over a wide area of Northern India, particularly Bihar and Uttar Pradesh.Sattu is also famous in telangana done as prasadam or Nivedyam for Batukamma.
There is One Drink Make from Sattu Called "Sattu Ghol" in Magadh.

Uses

Sattu is used in regional cuisine to varying degrees. In Bihar, Uttar Pradesh, Uttrakhand, Punjab and Delhi the use of sattu is extensive in various dishes. In Bihar, it is commonly served cold as a savory drink during intense heat waves in summer or as a porridge or soft dough. Sweet dishes combine sattu with fruit slices, sugar and milk. In savoury dishes, sattu may be flavored with green chili, lemon juice and salt. It is a popular stuffing in parathas. In Bihar, sattu is prepared with toasted gram flour as well as toasted barley, or a mixture of both. Sattu mixed with a little mustard oil and some spices is used as a stuffing in the traditional Bihari food .

In Punjab, it is used as a cold drink to mitigate heat and dehydration effects. Here sattu is a mix of toasted, ground barley, while some variants are also prepared by grinding roasted grams.

In Odisha, it is a popular breakfast and also called . Though there are many different ways to prepare , also known as sattu. It is generally mixed with ripe bananas, cottage cheese, yogurt or milk. 

Sattu made from ground barley can also be mixed with salt and turmeric and rolled into balls. Alternatively, millet and corn grains are also used.

Ingredients 
Sattu is prepared by dry roasting grains or grams, most often barley or bengal gram. In Odisha, Sattu or Chatua is made by dry roasting cashew, almond, millet, barley and chickpea and grinding to a fine flour. The traditional way of preparing sattu involves the use of an iron vessel in which the grains or grams are roasted in sand. Afterwards they are sieved and then ground into a fine flour.

Geography
Sattu is common in the states of  Magadh Region of Bihar , Bihar.
Jharkhand and Some other Regions of India Spreaded from Magadh like Purvanchal Region of Uttar Pradesh , Madhya Pradesh , Delhi.

References

External links
Manufacturing of sattu

Indian cuisine
Bihari cuisine
Odia cuisine
Jharkhandi cuisine